Nancy Deano is a Filipino former swimmer. She competed in three events at the 1976 Summer Olympics.

References

External links
 

Year of birth missing (living people)
Living people
Filipino female swimmers
Olympic swimmers of the Philippines
Swimmers at the 1976 Summer Olympics
Place of birth missing (living people)
Asian Games medalists in swimming
Asian Games bronze medalists for the Philippines
Swimmers at the 1974 Asian Games
Swimmers at the 1978 Asian Games
Medalists at the 1974 Asian Games